Armando Samper Gnecco (9 April 1920 – 14 September 2010) was a Colombian agronomist and engineer. He served as Minister of Agriculture of Colombia in 1966-67 and 1969-70, and was a founding member of the International Center for Tropical Agriculture, General Director of the Inter-American Institute for Agricultural Sciences (now known as Inter-American Institute for Cooperation on Agriculture) from 1960 to 1966, and Deputy General Director of FAO for Latin America from 1972 to 1974. Dean of Jorge Tadeo Lozano University (1971), President of the National Corporation for Forest Research and Development of Colombia, CONIF (1974–1978), and President of the Executive Board and General Director of the Colombian Sugarcane Research Center, Cenicaña (1978–1990).

He finished his secondary studies at the Gimnasio Moderno in Bogotá then moved to the United States to attend University of Maryland, College Park. From there he transferred to Cornell University where he graduated in 1943 with a B.Sc. in Agricultural Economy.

Personal life
Armando was born on 9 April 1920 in Bogotá to Daniel Samper Ortega and María Amalia Gnecco Fallón. He married on 26 July 1945 to Jean Kutschbach, whom he met during his studies in Cornell University, and with whom he had four children, Marta, Belén, Mario, and Cristián.

References

1920 births
2010 deaths
People from Bogotá
Armando
Cornell University College of Agriculture and Life Sciences alumni
Colombian Ministers of Agriculture
20th-century Colombian politicians